The 1950 Army Cadets football team represented the United States Military Academy in the 1950 college football season. Led by head coach Earl Blaik, the team finished with an 8–1 record. The Cadets offense scored 267 points, while the defense allowed 40 points. Bob Blaik was the starting quarterback.

Tom Lombardo, the captain of the 1944 Army team, was killed in action in Korea.  Two weeks before the Army–Navy Game, Johnny Trent, the captain of the 1949 Army team, was killed in action. Trent, and Arnold Galiffa, the starting quarterback of the 1949 Army team, were sent with the Eighth Army to Korea. With President Harry S. Truman in attendance, Navy beat Army by a score of 14–2. It was the first time Navy had beaten Army since 1943.

Schedule

Roster
QB Bob Blaik
Elmer Stout #26

1951 NFL Draft

References

Army
Army Black Knights football seasons
Army Cadets football